Hadroneura is a genus of flies belonging to the family Mycetophilidae.

The species of this genus are found in Europe and Northern America.

Species:
 Hadroneura kamtshatica Stackelberg, 1943 
 Hadroneura kincaidi (Coquillett, 1900)

References

Mycetophilidae
Sciaroidea genera